Apărătorii Patriei (Defenders of the Fatherland in English) is a metro station in Bucharest, designed to serve the Olteniței housing estate.

The station was opened on 24 January 1986 as part of the inaugural section of the line, from Piața Unirii to Depoul IMGB. In January 2012, construction workers who were doing foundation work at the nearby Apărătorii Patriei market accidentally discovered one of the original exits, which was part of the original plans of the station. Due to design issues with it, it was covered, and a set of new exits was built.

References

Bucharest Metro stations
Railway stations opened in 1986
1986 establishments in Romania